Taringa railway station is located on the Main line in Queensland, Australia. It serves the Brisbane suburb of Taringa.

History
Taringa station opened on 14 June 1875 as West Milton. The station was rebuilt in the 1950s as part of the quadruplication of the line.

Services
Taringa is served by City network services operating from Nambour, Caboolture, Kippa-Ring and Bowen Hills to Springfield Central, Ipswich and Rosewood.

Services by Platform

*Note: One weekday morning service (4:56am from Central) and selected afternoon peak services continue through to Rosewood.  At all other times, a change of train is required at Ipswich.

References

External links

Taringa station Queensland Rail
Taringa station Queensland's Railways on the Internet

Railway stations in Brisbane
Railway stations in Australia opened in 1875
Taringa, Queensland
Main Line railway, Queensland